Nigel George Paulet, 18th Marquess of Winchester (23 December 1941 – 8 April 2016) was a British peer and the premier marquess of England. He succeeded a cousin in the title in 1968. Lord Winchester lived in South Africa. He served as a member of the House of Lords for over thirty years from 5 March 1968 to 11 November 1999.

Early life
Nigel George Paulet was born on 23 December 1941 to George Cecil Paulet (1905–1961) and Hazel Margaret Wheeler. He has two siblings, an older sister, Angela Jane Paulet (b. 1939), and a younger brother, Timothy Guy Paulet (born 1944).  After his father's death in 1961, his mother remarried, to George Meyer, in 1962.

Paulet's great-great grandfather was Lord Charles Paulet (1802–1870), the son of Charles Paulet, 13th Marquess of Winchester. Upon the death of his unmarried first cousin once removed, Richard Paulet, 17th Marquess of Winchester, on 5 March 1968, the 26-year-old Nigel became the 18th Marquess of Winchester, the highest-ranking marquess in the United Kingdom. The 17th Marquess's grandfather, Colonel Charles William Paulet, was the great-grandfather of the 18th Marquess.

Parliament
Winchester's maiden speech in the House of Lords on 11 November 1970 was in favour of ending sanctions against Rhodesia.

Most of his later speeches were on the matters concerning Rhodesia and Southern Africa.

Personal life
On 25 November 1967, he married Rosemary Anne Hilton, daughter of Major Aubrey John Hilton.  They have two sons and one daughter:
 Christopher John Hilton Paulet, 19th Marquess of Winchester (born 30 July 1969); married Christine Mary Town in 1992, had issue:
 Lady Emma Louise Paulet (born 1 April 1993)
 Michael John Paulet, Earl of Wiltshire (born 31 August 1999)
 Lord Richard George Paulet (born 16 August 1971)
 Lady Susan Paulet (born 1976); married Major Lloyd Hains in 2006, child:
 Nicholas Roger Eaton Hains (born 12 April 2007)

Death
Paulet died in Gauteng, South Africa on 8 April 2016, at the age of 74. An announcement of his death was not made public until 2019.

References

External links
 

1941 births
2016 deaths
18
Nigel

Winchester